Panteniphis is a genus of mites in the family Digamasellidae. There are at least four described species in Panteniphis.

Species
These four species belong to the genus Panteniphis:
 Panteniphis africanus Genis, Loots & Ryke, 1969
 Panteniphis athiasae Hirschmann, 1983
 Panteniphis mirandus Willmann, 1949
 Panteniphis tanzaniae Hirschmann, 1983

References

Ascidae
Articles created by Qbugbot